Gromov's theorem may mean one of a number of results of Mikhail Gromov:

One of Gromov's compactness theorems:
 Gromov's compactness theorem (geometry) in Riemannian geometry
 Gromov's compactness theorem (topology) in symplectic topology

Gromov–Ruh theorem on almost flat manifolds
 Gromov's non-squeezing theorem in symplectic geometry
Gromov's theorem on groups of polynomial growth

See also

Bishop–Gromov inequality
Gromov–Thurston 2π theorem